Dovletmyrat Seyitmuhammedov (3 December 1996) is a Turkmen professional footballer who plays for FC Kopetdag and Turkmenistan as midfielder.

Club career 
In recent years he has been playing for the FC Kopetdag Ashgabat.

International career
Seyitmuhammedov received his debut call to the Turkmenistan national football team in May 2019: three FC Kopetdag players for the first time in the club's recent history were called up by the Croatian coach Ante Miše to join the national team.

9 June 2019 Seyitmuhammedov made his senior debut for Turkmenistan against Uganda, he came on as a substitute in the second half, replacing captain Arslanmyrat Amanov.

Honours 
 Turkmenistan Cup (1)
 Winner : 2018
 Turkmenistan Super Cup
 Finalist : 2019

References

External links
 
 

1996 births
Living people
Turkmenistan footballers
Turkmenistan international footballers
Association football midfielders